is a Los Angeles-based Asian model and actress known for her appearances in Crazy, Stupid, Love (2011), The Gorburger Show (2012–2017) and The NewsroomHBO (2016).

Biography
Ami Haruna was born in Tokyo where she started taking ballet at the age of four. She continued to dance through high school and even placed silver at the Tony Tee World Dance Competition. She soon got an early start in modeling and acting for a diet chocolate commercial when she was fourteen. Haruna spent highschool in Los Angeles and Haruna graduated college with a BA in Performing Arts in Japan, then Media and Communication and Psychology in California . She permanently moved to Los Angeles where she began modeling worldwide for ads such as Nike, Inc., Shiseido Bose and Southwest Airline. She gained further recognition as actress for starring in Crazy, Stupid, Love along with Ryan Gosling and Steve Carell.
After COVID hit Los Angeles she became a famous streamer globally for the live streaming app 17LIVEshe has won every event in USA since 2020 and won the title “Queen of Livit” and the best streamer award. Also had her billboard in Hollywood in 2021.

Personal life
Her grandfather is well known writer who has win Akutagawa Prize and multiple awards.
She has a son and a Pomeranian dog named Coconut. Haruna maintains her profile through Instagram and Facebook. She is fluent in English, Japanese and Korean.

Filmography

References

External links

1984 births
21st-century Japanese actresses
Actresses from Tokyo
American actresses of Japanese descent
American models of Japanese descent
Japanese emigrants to the United States
Japanese female models
Japanese film actresses
Japanese television actresses
Living people
21st-century American women